Rondo Emmett Cameron (February 20, 1925 – January 1, 2001) was an American professor of economic history. He was a native of Texas.  He graduated from Yale (1948) and received a Ph.D. degree at the University of Chicago (1952).  He taught at the University of Wisconsin, Madison from 1952.   In 1969, he went to Emory University where he was Kenan University Professor until his retirement as emeritus professor in 1993. He was president of the International Economic History Association (Sylla, 2001). He is well known for his book A Concise Economic History of the World: From Paleolithic Times to the Present (1989). According to the preface, the book was many years in the maturing, with passages in one chapter from an introductory undergraduate lecture at Yale in 1951.

Selected publications 
 Jerome Blum, Rondo Cameron, and Thomas G. Barnes. (1970). The European World. Little, Brown.
 Rondo Cameron et al. (1975). Civilizations: Western and World.
 Rondo E. Cameron. France and the Economic Development of Europe, 1800-1914: Conquests of Peace and Seeds of War (1961), a wide-ranging economic and business history
 _ (1967). Banking in the Early Stages of Industrialization.
 _  (1989). A Concise Economic History of the World: From Paleolithic Times to the Present, Oxford.
 Rondo Cameron and Larry Neal (2003, 4th ed.) A Concise Economic History of the World: From Paleolithic Times to the Present, 480 pp., including annotated bibliography, Oxford. Table of Contents,  editorial reviews and book description at Amazon.com.

References

External links 
 Rondo Cameron 1925-2001. A tribute, Emory University Department of History Newsletter, August, 2001.
 Richard Sylla (2001) EH.N: Rondo Cameron, 1925-2001. Biographical details and professional assessment.

20th-century American economists
1925 births
2001 deaths
Economic historians
20th-century American historians
20th-century American male writers
Historians of Europe
Yale University alumni
University of Chicago alumni
University of Wisconsin–Madison faculty
Emory University faculty
American male non-fiction writers